"Hip Hop Hooray" is a song by American hip hop group, Naughty by Nature, released in December 1992 as the first single from their third album, 19 Naughty III (1993). The song spent one week at number one on the US Billboard Hot R&B/Hip-Hop Songs chart, and reached number eight on the Billboard Hot 100. It contains samples from "Funky President" by James Brown, "Don't Change Your Love" by Five Stairsteps, "Make Me Say it Again, Girl" by Isley Brothers, "You Can't Turn Me Away" by Sylvia Striplin and "Sledgehammer" by Peter Gabriel. Pete Rock made a remix that samples Cannonball Adderley's "74 Miles Away". It was certified Platinum by the RIAA and has sold over 1,100,000 copies in the United States.

The song contains lyrics boasting the group's love of hip hop and their fascination with good-looking women. The Seattle Mariners would play the song after Ken Griffey Jr. was officially announced coming to bat at the Kingdome, especially in 1995, the year of the Mariners' first Major League Baseball playoff appearance. It plays at Yankee Stadium after a Yankees player hits a home run from 2017 until the middle of the 2019 season. It was brought back for the 2020 season. Kids Incorporated covered "Hip Hop Hooray" in 1993 in the Season 9 episode "Writing on the Wall". David Bellochio aka "Dave Drop A Load On Em" played and programmed all the keyboard and drum parts at his own Marion Recording Studios in Fairview, NJ.

Critical reception
In an retrospective review, Jesse Ducker from Albumism said the song is "just about as ubiquitous" as "O.P.P.". He added, "Most people remember the "Hey! Ho! Hey! Ho!" hook, but Treach and Vinnie Rock do a solid job trading four bar stanzas through the song's three verses. And Treach using "Tippy-tippy, pause, tippy-tippy pause" to describe him sneaking up on wack emcees is, if nothing else, creative." Upon the single release, Larry Flick from Billboard described it as "invigorating", noting that "once again, an anthemic chorus is the anchor for clever rhymes and a contagious melody. Rap purists will dig raw groove/lyrical undercurrent, though glossy production will glide right into the hearts of radio programmers." 

Reviewing 19 Naughty III, James Bernard from Entertainment Weekly stated, "Yes, there's an "O.P.P." on this one. "Hip Hop Hooray" is as catchy as the charttopper this New Jersey rap trio rode to superstardom, only the new flavor is not quite as frisky." Jean Rosenbluth from Los Angeles Times remarked that "the beats are mostly snappy and the rhymes catchy". Pan-European magazine Music & Media commented, "One of the golden rules for a hit is a good hook. When these rappers repetitively shout "Hey Hoo", like cheerleaders, everyone will join in automatically. "Hot hit hurray!" if you ask us." James Hamilton from Music Week'''s RM Dance Update described it as a "moderately jaunty rap swayer". Touré from Rolling Stone declared it as a "strong single", and an "anthem". Johnny Lee from Smash Hits felt that it "sounds a bit" like Jazzy Jeff's "Summertime", giving it three out of five.

Music video
The accompanying music video for "Hip Hop Hooray" was directed by Spike Lee, who also appears in it. Queen Latifah, Eazy-E, Monie Love, Da Youngsta's, Kris Kross, Tupac Shakur and Run–D.M.C. also make appearances in the video. A second version of the video was later published on Tommy Boy Records' official YouTube channel on January 6, 2018 that has removed Eazy-E's appearance from the video, replacing it with footage from previous scenes. It is also missing the copyright message that was displayed at the end of the original version. It is unclear when this edited video was produced or what the reason was for Eazy-E's removal. The video had generated more than 33 million views as of January 2023. The original unedited video is available on Naughty by Nature's YouTube channel.

Media usage
"Hip Hop Hooray" is featured as a playable track in the video game Rayman Raving Rabbids''.

Rita Wilson, actor, singer, and wife of another A-List entertainer, Tom Hanks, while in Australia, recovering from a bout with COVID-19, submitted a social media clip of herself performing the song. She later collaborated with members of Naughty By Nature to produce a remix of the song that posted on Youtube, to support a campaign, "Musicares COVID-19 Relief Fund."

The song is played in the Simpsons episode "The Burns and The Bees", in which the basketball team's gorilla mascot costume is shot after making a basket.

The song had been used by the New York Yankees when they score a home run in Yankee Stadium. The New Jersey Devils also use the song when they win a home game at the Prudential Center.

Track listing
 "Hip Hop Hooray" (LP Version)
 "Hip Hop Hooray" (Extended Mix)
 "The Hood Comes First" (LP Version)
 "Hip Hop Hooray" (Instrumental)
 "The Hood Comes First" (Instrumental)

Charts and certifications

Weekly charts

Year-end charts

Certifications

See also
List of number-one R&B singles of 1993 (U.S.)

References

1992 songs
1992 singles
1993 singles
Naughty by Nature songs
Tommy Boy Records singles
Music videos directed by Spike Lee
Songs written by Ronald Isley
Songs written by Ernie Isley
Songs written by Chris Jasper
Songs written by Rudolph Isley
Songs written by O'Kelly Isley Jr.
Songs written by Marvin Isley
Songs written by Treach